Nikola Marjanović may refer to:
 Nikola Marjanović (footballer, born 1905)
 Nikola Marjanović (footballer, born 1955)
 Nikola Marjanović (footballer, born 2001)
 Nikola Marjanović (singer)